Culicoides cummingi is a species of Culicoides. It is found in Central America.

References

cummingi
Insects described in 2004